Rafael Ramos Lozano (born 18 September 1982), known as Rafita, is a Spanish professional footballer who plays for CF UD Calpe. On the right side of the pitch, he can appear as both a defender or a midfielder.

Club career
Born in Palma de Mallorca, Balearic Islands, Rafita made his senior debut with local RCD Mallorca's reserves in the Segunda División B. On 28 August 2005 he played his first and only competitive match with the main squad, coming on as a 73rd-minute substitute in a 0–1 La Liga home loss against Deportivo de La Coruña.

Released by the club at the end of the season, Rafita resumed his career in the Segunda División, with Ciudad de Murcia, CD Castellón, Recreativo de Huelva and UD Almería, appearing in 206 league games in the process. He achieved promotion with the latter side in 2013, totalling nearly 2,000 minutes of action while starting in all of his 22 appearances.

Rafita was challenged by new signing Nélson in the 2013–14 campaign, but again contributed solidly (26 matches) as the Andalusians retained their recently-acquired status. He subsequently took his game to the lower leagues, where he represented Hércules CF, Novelda CF and Orihuela CF.

References

External links

1982 births
Living people
Spanish footballers
Footballers from Palma de Mallorca
Association football defenders
Association football midfielders
La Liga players
Segunda División players
Segunda División B players
Tercera División players
Divisiones Regionales de Fútbol players
RCD Mallorca B players
RCD Mallorca players
Ciudad de Murcia footballers
CD Castellón footballers
Recreativo de Huelva players
UD Almería players
Real Murcia players
Hércules CF players
Novelda CF players
Orihuela CF players